Dina Peskin, known professionally as Dina Doron and Dina Doronne, (Hebrew: דינה דורון; born 15 March 1940) is an Israeli film and stage actress.

Biography 

Doron was born in Afula, Israel on 15 March 1940 to Zivia and Emanuel Peskin. Doron is Jewish. She has often portrayed Jewish women throughout her career. She moved to New York to study theatre and dance in the 1950s. She trained in modern dance at the Martha Graham School. Her American theatre debut was on Broadway as Anne Frank in the play The Diary of Anne Frank. She went on to have a career as a film actress, starring in Israeli and French films including The Faithful City, The Glass Cage, Late Marriage, and A Tale of Love and Darkness. Doron returned to the stage in 2016 to portray Billy Elliot's grandmother in Billy Elliot the Musical at the Cinema City Gelilot Complex in Israel. In 2017 she voiced the role, both speaking and singing, of Mamá Coco in Pixar's Hebrew version of the digitally animated film Coco. As part of the cast of Coco, she sang on the Hebrew version of the track Remember Me, which won Best Original Song at the 90th Academy Awards in 2018. She was cast in the 2020 Netflix original miniseries Unorthodox, which premiered on 26 March 2020.

Personal life 
Doron married Serbian film producer Ilan Eldad in 1964. They have two children, Dan Eldad and Ruth Eldad-Seidne. Her son is an Israeli government official and lawyer.

Stage 
 The Diary of Anne Frank as Anne Frank (1956)
 Billy Elliot the Musical as Billy Elliot's grandmother (2016)

Filmography 
 The Faithful City (1952) as Anna
 The Glass Cage (1965) as Sonia
 Sinaia (1966) as Bedouin Woman
 Moses the Lawgiver (1973) as Jochebed
 Jesus (1979) as Saint Elizabeth
 The New Media Bible: Book of Genesis (1979) as Sarah
 A Thousand Little Kisses (1981) as Routa
 Ha-Shiga'on Hagadol (1986) as Nurse Hava
 Late Marriage (2001) as Luba
 The Galilee Eskimos (2006) as Fanny
 You Don't Mess with the Zohanr (2008) as Mrs. Dvir, Zohan's mothe
 A Tale of Love and Darkness (2015) as Grandma Klausner
 Holy Lands (2017) as Mrs. Lapierre
 Coco (Hebrew Version) (2017) as Mamá Coco (voice)
 Unorthodox (2020, TV Mini Series) as Bubbe, Esty's grandmother

External links 
 Dina Doron IMDB

References 

Living people
1940 births
20th-century Israeli actresses
21st-century Israeli actresses
Israeli film actresses
Israeli stage actresses
Jewish Israeli actresses
People from Afula